The National Association of Schools of Art and Design (NASAD), founded in 1944, is an accrediting organization of colleges, schools and universities in the United States. The organization establishes standards for graduate and undergraduate degrees. Member institutions complete periodic peer review processes to become, and remain, accredited. NASAD accreditation should not be confused with regional accreditation.

Standards for accreditation
The National Association for Schools of Art and Design has stringent criteria for accrediting schools. For example, the NASAD requires that schools clearly publish their tuition rates and course descriptions. In addition, board members assess the schools' art curricula and promote new standards to advance art education.

See also
Council on Higher Education Accreditation
List of recognized accreditation associations of higher learning
School accreditation
US Department of Education

References

External links
Official Website

School accreditors
Educational organizations based in the United States